The Countess from Podskalí is a 1926 Czechoslovak comedy film directed by Karel Lamač. The film is considered lost.

Cast
Theodor Pištěk as Innkeeper Štětina
Anny Ondra as Liduška (as Anny Ondráková)
Vladimír Majer as Joza
Karel Lamač as Count Viktor of Renné
Jan W. Speerger as Photographer Lambert
Mary Jansová as Anna Salfická
Ferdinand Kaňkovský as Music teacher Lukáš
Ladislav Desenský as Fiala
Emilie Nitschová as Countess Eleonora of Renné
Oldřich Speerger as Child
Přemysl Pražský
Adolf Branald  (as Karel Branald)
Jaroslav Vojta

References

External links
 

1926 films
1926 comedy films
Czechoslovak black-and-white films
Czech silent films
Films directed by Karel Lamač
Czech comedy films
1926 lost films
Lost comedy films